Kullander is a Swedish surname. Notable people with the surname include:

Fang Fang Kullander,(1962–2010), Swedish-Chinese ichthyologist
Sven O. Kullander (born 1952), Swedish ichthyologist
Sven Kullander (physicist) (1936–2014)

See also  
 11013 Kullander, a main-belt asteroid named for the physicist
 Kurlander

Swedish-language surnames